Rajca is a village in the Resen Municipality of North Macedonia, northeast of Lake Prespa.

Demographics 
Rajca has 66 inhabitants as of the most recent census of 2002. The village's population has steadily declined since the 1970s.

Gallery

References 

Villages in Resen Municipality